Iowa Highway 149 is a highway which runs from south to north in Iowa. Iowa 149 begins at U.S. Highway 34 in Ottumwa and ends at Williamsburg at Interstate 80. The first  of Iowa 149 are overlapped by U.S. Highway 63 Business, the former route of U.S. Highway 63 through Ottumwa.

Route description

Iowa Highway 149 begins at U.S. 34 in Ottumwa.  It goes north and meets U.S. Highway 63 north of Ottumwa and continues north until meeting Iowa Highway 23.  It then turns east, and meets Iowa Highway 21 before entering Hedrick.  It then continues east through Martinsburg, then turns north at an intersection with Iowa Highway 78.  Iowa 149 then continues north into Sigourney.  After a brief concurrency with Iowa Highway 92, it turns north towards Webster.  At Webster, it meets Iowa Highway 22 and turns east with Iowa 22.  Iowa 149 and Iowa 22 run concurrent into South English, then Iowa 149 turns north.  Iowa 149 goes north through North English, then continues north until turning east to enter Parnell.  Iowa 149 then turns north to go through Williamsburg, then ends at an interchange with Interstate 80.

History
Iowa Highway 149 was created October 16, 1926 from a segment of highway which was previously Iowa Highway 13.  It went from U.S. Highway 63 north of Ottumwa to U.S. Highway 32 (later U.S. Highway 6) near the Amana Colonies.  In March 1930, the highway was extended north to Cedar Rapids to end at U.S. Highway 30, replacing Iowa 150.  In 1985, the highway was shortened to its current north terminus as U.S. Highway 151 was extended along the former Iowa 149 between U.S. 6 and U.S. 30, and the segment between I-80 and U.S. 6 was converted to Iowa County Road V77.

The southern terminus has been moved twice.  On July 16, 1997, Iowa 149 took over an old alignment of U.S. Highway 63 between the current U.S. 63 interchange north of Ottumwa and the current Iowa 23 intersection upon the relocation of U.S. 63 between Ottumwa and Oskaloosa.  Later, on November 19, 2007, upon another relocation of U.S. 63 in the Ottumwa area, Iowa 149 was extended south to meet in Ottumwa with U.S. Highway 34.

Major intersections

References

External links

149
Ottumwa, Iowa
Transportation in Wapello County, Iowa
U.S. Route 63
Transportation in Iowa County, Iowa